Baye Modou Fall (born December 21, 2003) is a Senegalese high school basketball player who attends Accelerated Prep Academy in Denver, Colorado. At center, he stands  and weighs . He is a considered a consensus five-star recruit.

Early years
Fall grew up in the Senegalese capital of Dakar, mainly playing association football as a goalkeeper. His older brother and uncle encouraged him to focus full-time on basketball at the age of 13, when they noticed he had potential on the court. When he was 15, Fall moved to the United States to join his cousin, Mamadou Sow, and their uncle in Denver, enrolling at Lincoln Academy Charter School to finish the eighth grade. The main reason for the move was an opportunity for a better education, with Fall hoping to be an architect. Unlike Sow, he already knew some English, though they both used social media and rap music to learn casual English and slang.

In March 2019, Fall made a strong first impression on scouts with a standout performance at the Pangos Junior All-American Camp, a showcase for the top middle school talent in the country. Basketball writer Frank Burlison, a member of the USBWA Hall of Fame, compared his dominance to that of Deandre Ayton's at the same event six years prior.

High school career
Fall followed his cousin and enrolled at Lutheran High School in Parker, Colorado. He averaged 19.0 points, 10.5 rebounds and 3.8 blocks per game while shooting 67 percent from the field as a freshman, leading his school to an appearance in the class 3A state quarterfinals. He earned second-team class 3A all-state and second-team MaxPreps Freshman All-American honors.

As a sophomore, Fall averaged 22.1 points, 10.0 rebounds and 3.2 blocked shots per game, guiding Lutheran to a 16–1 record and a class 3A state title. He recorded 10 points, 11 rebounds, and six blocks in the championship game against St. Mary's. At the end of they year he was named class 3A state player of the year, MaxPreps Colorado Player of the Year, and a first-team MaxPreps Sophomore All-American. That summer he shared co-MVP honors with JJ Taylor at the 2021 Pangos All-American Camp Top30 game in Las Vegas.

Ahead of his junior season, Fall announced he was transferring to the newly-formed Denver Prep Academy, a member of the Grind Session national prep basketball league. However, after appearing in just ten games, he was dismissed from the team in February 2022 for a violation of team rules. He averaged 14.3 points, 7.1 rebounds and 1.6 blocks per game at the time of his dismissal. That summer, Fall averaged 18 points, 10 rebounds and three blocks a game for the Colorado Hawks in the Adidas 3SSB circuit. He was named co-MVP of the Pangos All-American Camp Top 30 All-Star Game in June, followed by a performance as the top scorer and rebounder at the NBAPA Top 100 Camp in July.

For his senior year, Fall enrolled at Accelerated Prep, another Denver-based private school competing in the Grind Session league as a new member.  On January 24, 2023, Fall was selected as a McDonald's All-American.

Recruiting
Baye received his first offer from Minnesota when he was still in the eighth grade. By the end of his freshman season at Lutheran he also held offers from Georgia, Georgetown and Kansas.

In August 2022, Fall announced that he had trimmed his list of schools to seven: Arkansas, Auburn, Colorado, Kansas State, Rutgers, Seton Hall and Texas. He had received more than 30 offers at this point.

Fall committed to Arkansas on November 15, 2022.

Notes

References

Living people
2003 births
Senegalese men's basketball players
Centers (basketball)
Sportspeople from Dakar